Eupithecia persidis is a moth in the family Geometridae. It is found in Iran (Mazandaran). The habitat consists of mountainous steppe with feather grass.

The forewings are pale grey with a soft yellowish tinge and blackish grey transverse lines. The hindwings are slightly paler, pale grey with blackish grey transverse lines.

Etymology
The species name is derived from Persidis (from persis) an old Greek word from Pārs (Arabian Fārs), meaning homeland of the Persian people.

References

Moths described in 2012
persidis
Moths of the Middle East